Boophis bottae is a species of frog in the family Mantellidae endemic to Madagascar.

Distribution and habitat
The species inhabits the eastern rainforest belt of Madagascar at altitudes of 800–1,000 m. It occurs along forest streams, in which it is assumed to breed, and can be found at the edge but never fully outside of rainforest.

Conservation

B. bottae is locally abundant and currently classified as Least Concern by the IUCN. However, populations are suspected to be shrinking due to ongoing habitat destruction through agriculture, logging, charcoaling, and various invasive species. Other species in this genus have shown susceptibility to chytridiomycosis, however this does not currently appear to afflict amphibians in Madagascar.

References

bottae
Endemic frogs of Madagascar
Amphibians described in 2002
Taxonomy articles created by Polbot